Juan Gabriel Aguilar Osinaga (born 15 March 1987) is a professional footballer from Bolivia. , he plays as a defender for Oriente Petrolero.

Biography
Aguilar was born in Cotoca. He holds a bachelor's degree in humanities and this year  he obtained his degree in Business Administration with a specialization in Sports Management from the Washington University in St. Louis (D-USA).

Club career
Gabriel Aguilar made his professional debut on 10 June 2006 with Oriente Petrolero vs San José de Oruro in Ramón Tahuichi Aguilera Stadium in Santa Cruz de la Sierra, having come up through the Oriente Petrolero youth system.

In 2007, Aguilar was selected to represent Bolivia in the Under-20 division of the 2007 Pan American Games.  In 2006, he was selected for the Bolivian Under-20 team to compete in the "Youth of America" championship in Paraguay.

Skills and technical strengths:
• Leadership • Dexterity • High performance • Competitiveness • Orderly and precise in the game • Defense impeccable • Overflow of balance with the opposing team is on the left or right lane.

Mr. Gabriel Aguilar, is considered one of the best soccer players in Bolivia for its multipurpose function as left and right side defense. As compared to Ex-Real Madrid, the Brazilian star "Cicinho"

In 2010, Mr Aguilar and Sports Club Oriente Petrolero became National Champions LPFB.

Mr. Aguilar, in July 2011, incorporated to Club Universitario de Sucre.

Recognition and awards
 Named "Best Player" of 2006 by the Cruceña Football Association (ACF) Bolivia
 Victoria Alada Prize: awarded by the Secretary of Sports to the Best Footballer, 2007
 Finalist, Copa Aerosur, 2007
 Finalist, LFPB National Tournament Playoffs, 2009
 Finalist, LFPB National Tournament Opening Round, 2010
 Champion, LFPB National Winter Tournament, 2010
 Champion, LFPB National Tournament Closing Round, 2010

His calm ball-handling, strong technique and his burst down the right sideline led his teammate Thiago Leitao to christen [Aguilar] "Cicinho", because his style is reminiscent of the Brazilian Real Madrid player.

References

1987 births
Living people
Association football defenders
Bolivian footballers
Bolivia youth international footballers
Club San José players
Nacional Potosí players
Oriente Petrolero players
People from Andrés Ibáñez Province
Universitario de Sucre footballers
Olin Business School (Washington University) alumni